Justine Penelope Heathcote Allain Chapman (née Chapman; born 30 June 1967) is a British Anglican priest, academic, and former teacher. Since 2013, she has served as the Archdeacon of Boston in the Diocese of Lincoln. She was previously a religious studies teacher, a parish priest in the Diocese of Southwark, and then a member of the teaching staff of South East Institute for Theological Education (SEITE).

Early life and education
Justine Chapman was born on 30 June 1967 in Durham, England. She studied at King's College London, graduating with a Bachelor of Arts (BA) degree and the Associateship of King's College (AKC) in 1988. She remained at King's College to undertake teacher training, and she completed her Postgraduate Certificate in Education (PGCE) in 1989. She then spent two years, from 1989 to 1991, as head of religious studies at South Hampstead High School, an all-girls private school in South Hampstead, London.

In 1991, Allain Chapman entered Lincoln Theological College, an Anglican theological college, to train for Holy Orders. During this time she also studied theology at the University of Nottingham, and she graduated with a Master of Divinity (M.Div.) degree in 1993. She later continued her studies, and graduated from King's College London with a Doctor of Theology and Ministry (DThMin) degree in 2011.

Ordained ministry
Allain Chapman was ordained in the Church of England as a deacon in 1993 and as a priest in 1994. From 1993 to 1996, she served her curacy at Christ Church and St Paul, Forest Hill in the Diocese of Southwark. She served as Vicar of St Paul's Church, Clapham between 1996 and 2004. She was a member of General Synod of the Church of England from 2000 to 2004, having been elected by the clergy of the Diocese of Southwark as one of their representatives. In 2004, she joined the South East Institute for Theological Education (SEITE) as Director of Mission and Pastoral Studies. She was additionally Vice-Principal of the SEITE between 2007 and 2013.

In March 2013, it was announced that Allain Chapman had been appointed as the Archdeacon of Boston in the Diocese of Lincoln; this would bring the number of archdeacons in the diocese to three. She was installed as archdeacon during a service at Lincoln Cathedral on 8 September 2013. In 2015, she was elected a member of General Synod of the Church of England for the Diocese of Lincoln.

Personal life
In 1990, the then Justine Chapman married Thomas Allain; she added her husband's surname to hers to create a double-barrelled surname (and her husband did likewise); together they have four children.

Selected works

References

External links
Twitter account

Archdeacons of Boston
Women Anglican clergy
20th-century English Anglican priests
21st-century English Anglican priests
Schoolteachers from County Durham
Alumni of King's College London
Alumni of Lincoln Theological College
Alumni of the University of Nottingham
1967 births
Living people